Wynthryth of March was an early medieval saint of Anglo Saxon England.

He is known to history from the Secgan Hagiography and The Confraternity Book of  St Gallen. Very little is known of his life or career. However, he was associated with the town of March, Cambridgeshire, and he may have been a relative of King Ethelstan.

References
≤

Year of birth unknown
Year of death unknown
Medieval English saints
East Anglian saints
English Christian monks